Marie Benešová (born 17 April 1948) is a Czech politician and lawyer who served as Minister of Justice under Prime Minister Andrej Babiš from 2019 to 2021, having previously held the position between 2013 and 2014, as a part of Jiří Rusnok's Cabinet.

References

1948 births
Politicians from Prague
Charles University alumni
Czech Social Democratic Party MPs
Justice ministers of the Czech Republic
Living people
Members of the Chamber of Deputies of the Czech Republic (2013–2017)
ANO 2011 Government ministers
Czech women lawyers
Female justice ministers
Women government ministers of the Czech Republic
21st-century Czech women politicians
20th-century Czech lawyers